Ben Kilner may refer to:

 Ben Kilner (snowboarder) (born 1988), Scottish professional snowboarder
 Ben Kilner (rugby league) (born 1999), British former professional rugby league footballer